"Carry You Home" is the third single from James Blunt's second studio album, All the Lost Souls. The single was released on 24 March 2008. The song peaked at No. 20 on the UK Singles Chart. The song had already debuted at No. 173 in September 2007, solely on download sales of the album All the Lost Souls. The single was Blunt's last release to be available on three different physical formats.

Release
The single was released on three different physical formats. CD1 includes an exclusive live recording of "Young Folks", taken from the live lounge sessions on BBC Radio 1. CD2 includes a live version of "Same Mistake", recorded in Ibiza, as well as the video for "Carry You Home" and an exclusive live AOL video of "1973". The 7" single includes an exclusive live recording of "Wisemen", also recorded in Ibiza.

Music video
The video for the song, shot entirely in black and white, shows the story of a man travelling to return personal belongings of a dead soldier to the soldier's wife (do note that the soldier is female -- this is explicit in the lyrics and in the video; remember, "someone's little girl was taken from the world tonight," not someone's little boy, nor someone's son. The video was filmed in Dorset, south-west England, and features scenes of Wareham railway station, houses and the valley in Swanage, the region around St. Aldhelm's Head and the twelfth-century St. Aldhelm's Chapel. The combat scene was shot at Bovington Camp, where Blunt had been stationed during his service in the British Army, and features soldiers from the camp.

Track listings
CD1
 "Carry You Home" (Radio Edit) - 3:51
 "Young Folks" (Live From Radio 1) - 3:49

CD2
 "Carry You Home" (Radio Edit) - 3:51
 "Same Mistake" (Live in Ibiza) - 4:32
 "Carry You Home" (Video) - 3:55
 "1973" (AOL Session Video) - 4:38

7-inch vinyl
 "Carry You Home" (Radio Edit) - 3:51
 "Wisemen" (Live in Ibiza) - 4:15

Charts

Certifications

References

James Blunt songs
2000s ballads
2007 songs
2008 singles
Folk ballads
Rock ballads
Music videos directed by Jake Nava
Songs written by Max Martin
Songs written by James Blunt
Black-and-white music videos
Song recordings produced by Tom Rothrock